The 1892 Invercargill mayoral election was held on 1 December 1892 as part of that year's local elections.

Councillor Duncan McFarlane defeated former mayor George Froggatt.

Results
The following table gives the election results:

References

1892 elections in New Zealand
Mayoral elections in Invercargill